Sweet Haven or Sweethaven may refer to:

 Sweet Haven, fictional town setting of the comic strip Popeye
 Popeye Village, also known as Sweethaven Village, tourist attraction in Malta
 Sweet Haven, novel by Lakambini Sitoy
 Sweet Haven Tradition, Holstein cattle sire